Nafsi Huru (born on 10 October 1986) is a Kenyan rapper. He is a song writer and co-founder of Sheng magazine.

Biography 
Huru was born and raised in the coastal parts of Kenya, Mombasa in 1986. He started his solo career in 2012 and released the first volume of his mixtape featuring hip hop community whose reception inspired him to embrace art professionally. The mixtape featured a global network of hip hop artists. He did three music videos for the songs Still Strong, 254 - 256 cypher and Ukweli. Nafsi Huru performs with the Swahili Jazz Band where he is part of the management team.

Festivals 
Nafsi Huru as a performing artiste and Swahili hip hop ambassador has performed across Kenya on different social events and represented Kenya in international festivals such as:

Jukwani Festival 2009
Lamu Cultural Festival 2009
Mombasa cultural Festival 2010
Swahili Festival to mark the end of slavery in the island of Mayotte (France) 2010
Story Moja Hay Festival 2011
Doadoa Arts Festival Uganda 2013
Sawasawa Festival 2013
Sawasawa Festival 2014

Style

Hip Hop Hook Up 
Founder and Director of the Hiphop Hook Up alongside fellow artiste Smallz Lethal. The Hiphop Hook Up is an event whose objective is to provide a platform for talented individuals from the hip hop culture to showcase, learn and earn from their skill set. The event entails artist workshops, concerts, and an open market for creative; it has been in existence since 2013 happening every second Saturday of the month at Sarakasi Dome in Nairobi and has since grown to other towns like Mombasa and Kisii.

Works

Tribe 43 
Tribe 43 is a one-page magazine featured in the People Daily, the number one free national newspaper in Kenya. Nafsi Huru is a co-founder of this first Sheng magazine in a national publication. The entertainment magazine communicates in the language of the people and aims to build national cohesion amongst youth as it uplifts Kenyan talent not covered by most mainstream media.

References 

Living people
Kenyan rappers
1986 births